Wilberforce University is a private historically black university in Wilberforce, Ohio.  Affiliated with the African Methodist Episcopal Church (AME), it was the first college to be owned and operated by African Americans.  It participates in the United Negro College Fund.

Central State University, also in Wilberforce, Ohio, began as a department of Wilberforce University where Ohio state legislators could sponsor scholarship students.

The college was founded in 1856 by a unique collaboration between the Cincinnati, Ohio, Conference of the Methodist Episcopal Church and the African Methodist Episcopal Church (AME) to provide classical education and teacher training for black youth. It was named after William Wilberforce. The first board members were leaders both black and white.

The outbreak of the American Civil War (1861–65) resulted in a decline in students from the South, who were the majority, and the college closed in 1862 because of financial losses. The AME Church purchased the institution in 1863 to ensure its survival, making it the first black-owned and operated college in the nation. AME Bishop Daniel Payne was one of the university's original founders and became its first president after re-opening; he was the first African American to become a college president in the United States.  After an arson fire in 1865, the college was aided by donations from prominent white supporters and a grant from the US Congress to support rebuilding. Later it received support from the state legislature.

During the 1890s, scholar W. E. B. Du Bois taught at the university. In the late 19th century, it enlarged its mission to include black students from South Africa.

History
Wilberforce College was founded to educate African-American students. Twenty years earlier, a similar plan in New Haven, Connecticut, was met with a near-riot (New Haven Excitement), and was quickly abandoned. (See Simeon Jocelyn.) Discrimination against Blacks was legal, and the white colleges that would accept Black students could be counted on one hand (Grinnell College, Iowa, (1879, first Graduate) Hillsdale College Michigan, the Oneida Institute, the Oberlin Collegiate Institute (later Oberlin College), and New-York Central College).

Located three miles (5 km) from the county seat of Xenia, Ohio in the southwestern part of the state, what developed as Wilberforce University was founded as a collaboration among leaders of the Cincinnati Conference of the Methodist Episcopal Church and the African Methodist Episcopal Church (AME  Church).  They planned to promote classical education and teacher training for black youth.  Among the first 24 members of the tri-racial board of trustees in 1855 were Bishop Daniel A. Payne, Rev. Lewis Woodson, and Messrs. Ishmael Keith and Alfred Anderson, all of the AME Church.  Also on the Board were Salmon P. Chase, then Governor of Ohio and a strong supporter of abolition; a member of the Ohio State Legislature, and other Methodist leaders from the white community.  They named the college after the British abolitionist and statesman William Wilberforce. Rev Campbell Maxwell later became a trustee in 1896.

It was named Tawawa House after the springs in the area, a word derived from a Shawnee term for "clear or golden water". This color was associated with the natural springs nearby because of its high iron content. White people had founded the health resort in 1851 because of the springs, which they also called Yellow Springs. The waters had long been reputed to have health benefits.

Because of its location, this resort area had attracted summer people from both Cincinnati and the South, particularly after completion of the Little Miami Railroad in 1846. Some people in this area of abolitionist sentiment were shocked when wealthy white Southern planters patronized the resort with their entourages of enslaved African-American mistresses and mixed-race "natural" children.

Given migration patterns, this was also an area where numerous free people of color settled, many having moved across the Ohio River from the South to find better work and living conditions. Some were pushed from Southern states, which often required newly manumitted individuals to leave within a certain time period. Xenia had quite a large free black population, as did other towns in southern Ohio, such as Chillicothe, Yellow Springs and Zanesville. Free blacks and anti-slavery white supporters used houses in Xenia as stations on the Underground Railroad in the years before the Civil War. Wilberforce College also supported freedom-seeking slaves. Many of these free people of color were also had Native ancestry, Daniel Payne himself being of Catawba descent. 

The college opened for classes in 1856, and by 1858 its trustees selected Rev. Richard S. Rust as the first president. Overriding some protest by men, in the 1850s the college hired Frances E. W. Harper, an abolitionist poet, as the first woman to teach at the school.

By 1860 the private university had more than 200 students.  It is notable that most were from the South, the "natural" mixed-race sons and daughters of wealthy white planters and their enslaved African-American mistresses. The fathers paid for the educations that were denied their children in the South. They were among the fathers who did not abandon their mixed-race children but provided them with the social capital of education and sometimes property.

The outbreak of the Civil War threatened the college's finances. The Southern planters withdrew their children, and no more paying students came from the South. The Methodist church said it had to divert its resources to support the war. The college closed temporarily in 1862 when the Cincinnati Methodist Church was unable to fund it fully.

Led by Bishop Daniel A. Payne, in 1863 the African Methodist Episcopal Church (AME) decided to buy the college to ensure its survival; they paid the cost of its debt. They sold another property to raise the money. Founders were Bishop Payne, who was selected as its president; James A. Shorter, pastor of the AME Church in Zanesville, Ohio and a future bishop; and Dr. John G. Mitchell, principal of the Eastern District Public School of Cincinnati. Payne was the first African American to become a college president in the United States.

When an arson fire damaged some of the buildings in 1865, Payne went to his network to appeal for aid in rebuilding the college. Salmon P. Chase, then Chief Justice of the Supreme Court of the United States, and Dr. Charles Avery from Pittsburgh each contributed $10,000 to rebuild the college. Mary E. Monroe, another white supporter, contributed $4200. In addition, the US Congress approved a $25,000 grant for the college, which raised additional monies privately from a wide range of donors.

In 1888 the AME Church came to an agreement with the Republican Party-dominated state legislature that brought considerable financial support and political patronage to the college. It negotiated contemporary pressures to emphasize industrial education for many black youth by accommodating both that and the classical education.

As an act of political patronage, the state legislature established a commercial, normal and industrial (CNI) department at Wilberforce College.  While this created complications for administration and questions about the mission of the college, in the near term it brought tens of thousands of dollars annually in state aid to the campus.  Each state legislator could award an annual scholarship to the CNI department at Wilberforce, enabling hundreds of African-American students to attend classes. The state-funded students could complete liberal arts at the college, and students at Wilberforce could also take "industrial" classes.

By the mid-1890s, the college also admitted students from South Africa, as part of the AME Church's mission to Africa. The church helped support such students with scholarships, as well as arranging board with local families. An 1898 report published by the AME Church listed the university as having 20 faculty, 334 students, and 246 graduates.

The college became a center of black cultural and intellectual life in southwestern Ohio.  Because the area did not receive many European immigrants, blacks had more opportunities at diverse work. Xenia and nearby towns developed a professional black elite.

Generations of leaders: teachers, ministers, doctors, politicians and college administrators, and later men and women of all occupations, have been educated at the university. In the 19th century, Bishop Payne established his dream, a theological seminary, which was named in his honor.  Top-ranking scholars taught at the college, including W.E.B. Du Bois, the philologist William S. Scarborough, Edward Clarke, and John G. Mitchell, dean of the seminary. In 1894 Lieutenant Charles Young, the third black graduate of West Point and at the time the only African-American commissioned officer in the US Army, led the newly established military science department.

Additional leading scholars taught at the college in the early 20th century, such as Theophilus Gould Steward, a politician, theologian and missionary; and the sociologist Richard R. Wright, Jr., the first African American to earn a PhD from the University of Pennsylvania. He was a future AME bishop and became president of Wilberforce. These men were also prominent in the American Negro Academy, founded in 1897 to support the work of scholars, writers and other intellectuals. In 1969 the organization was revived as the Black Academy of Arts and Letters.

In 1941, the normal/industrial department was expanded by development of a four-year curriculum. In 1947, this section was split from the university and given independent status. It was renamed as Central State College in 1951. With further development of programs and departments, in 1965 it achieved university status as Central State University.

Growth of Wilberforce University after the mid-20th century led to construction of a new campus in 1967, located one mile (1.6 km) away. In 1974, the area was devastated by an F5 tornado that was part of the 1974 Super Outbreak, which destroyed much of the city of Xenia and the old campus of Wilberforce.

Older campus buildings still in use include the Carnegie Library, built in 1909 with matching funds from the Carnegie Foundation, and listed on the National Register of Historic Places; Shorter Hall, built in 1922; and the Charles Leander Hill Gymnasium, built in 1958. The former residence of Charles Young near Wilberforce was designated as a National Historic Landmark by the US Department of Interior, in recognition of his significant and groundbreaking career in the US Army.

In the 1970s, the university established the National Afro-American Museum and Cultural Center, to provide exhibits and outreach to the region. It is now operated by the Ohio Historical Society. The university also supports the national Association of African American Museums, to provide support and professional guidance especially to smaller museums across the country.

In 2021 the university announced it was cutting tuition by 15% for Ohio residents.

2008 Financial aid audit
In 2008 the US Department of Education, Office of the Inspector General (OIG) completed an audit of financial management, specifically the university's management of Title IV funds, which related to its work-study program. For the two-year audit period (2004–2005, 2005–2006) the audit found numerous faults. In summary, the OIG found that the university did not comply with Title IV, HEA requirements because of administrative problems, including staff turnover, insufficient financial aid staff, failure to have written procedures, and lack of communication with other offices. The university worked with auditors to set up appropriate staff and procedures.

Presidents
 Richard Rust, 1858–1862 (under the joint board of trustees representing the Methodist Episcopal and African Methodist Episcopal churches)
 Daniel A. Payne, 1863–1876, first president of the college under AME operation
 Benjamin F. Lee, 1876–1884
 Samuel T. Mitchell, 1884–1900
 Joshua H. Jones, 1900–1908
 William S. Scarborough, 1908–1920
 John A. Gregg, 1920–1924
 Gilbert H. Jones, 1924–1932
 Richard R. Wright, Jr., 1932–1936, 1941–1942
 D. Ormonde Walker, 1936–1941
 Charles H. Wesley, 1942–1947
 Charles Leander Hill, 1947–1956
 Rembert E. Stokes, 1956–1976
 Charles E. Taylor, 1976–1984
 Yvonne Walker Taylor,  1984–1988
 John L. Henderson, 1988–2002
 Floyd Flake, 2002–2008
 Patricia Hardaway, 2009–2013,
 Wilma Mishoe, interim 
 Algeania Marie Warren Freeman, 2014–2016, former president of Livingstone College and Martin University
 Herman J. Felton, Jr., 2016–2018
 Elfred Anthony Pinkard, 2018–present

Academics

Cooperative education
Wilberforce requires all students to participate in cooperative education to meet graduation requirements. The cooperative program places students in internships that provide practical work experience in addition to academic training. It has been a required part of the curriculum at Wilberforce since 1966.

NASA SEMAA project
In October 2006, Wilberforce held the grand opening and dedication for the NASA Science, Engineering, Mathematics and Aerospace Academy (SEMAA) and the associated Aerospace Education Laboratory (AEL). It was attended by Dr. Bernice G. Alston, deputy assistant administrator of NASA's office of Education, and the Dave Hobson, U.S. Representative from Ohio's 7th congressional district.
NASA's program was designed to provide training in science, technology, engineering, and mathematics to underprivileged students to support NASA's future needs. There were 17 NASA SEMAA project sites through the United States. Through this partnership, Wilberforce offered training sessions for students in grades K-12 during the academic year and during the summer. The AEL is computerized classroom that provided technology to students in grades 7–12 that supported the SEMAA training sessions.

Student activities

NPHC organizations
All nine of the National Pan-Hellenic Council organizations currently have chapters at Wilberforce University. These organizations are:

Athletics
The Wilberforce athletic teams are called the Bulldogs. The university is a member of the National Association of Intercollegiate Athletics (NAIA), primarily competing in the Mid-South Conference (MSC) since the 2022–23 academic year. The Bulldogs previously competed as an NAIA Independent within the Continental Athletic Conference from 2012–13 to 2021–22, and in the defunct American Mideast Conference from 1999–2000 to 2011–12.

Wilberforce competes in 11 intercollegiate varsity sports: Men's sports include basketball, cross country, golf and track & field (indoor and outdoor); while women's sports include basketball, cross country, golf, spirit teams and track & field (indoor and outdoor).

Intramurals
Students also participate in the following intramural sports: basketball, softball, volleyball, flag football, and tennis.

Notable alumni

See also 

Historically black colleges and universities

Representation in other media
 Dolen Perkins-Valdez's novel Wench (2010) explores the lives of several enslaved women of color brought to the Tawawa House resort during the summers by their Southern white masters. They were among the visitors in the years before the property was bought for use as the college.

References

External links
 Official website
 Official athletics website
 Horace Talbert, The Sons of Allen: Together with a Sketch of the Rise and Progress of Wilberforce University, Wilberforce, Ohio, 1906, Documenting the American South, University of North Carolina

 
Historically black universities and colleges in the United States
Private universities and colleges in Ohio
Universities and colleges affiliated with the African Methodist Episcopal Church
Education in Greene County, Ohio
Educational institutions established in 1856
Buildings and structures in Greene County, Ohio
Universities and colleges affiliated with the Methodist Episcopal Church
Antebellum educational institutions that admitted African Americans
1856 establishments in Ohio